NotchUp, Inc. was a Silicon Valley based start-up that was first to offer an on-demand recruiting service that uses crowdsourcing combined with social media and an advanced web-based technology platform.  NotchUp is a privately held company headquartered in Palo Alto, California.

The company's service is based on the premise that the best people are already employed, but are open to exploring opportunities that offer a better value proposition than their current job. NotchUp finds passive candidates for job postings using a crowdsourced group of independent contractors called Talent Scouts.  NotchUp posts positions on their web site and the 2000+ Talent Scouts use NotchUp's proprietary software to match their personal and professional connections in social media such as LinkedIn, Facebook, MySpace and Twitter.  Companies with job postings rate the candidates and either independently take the next steps or use NotchUp's services to make connections and do additional screening.  Talent Scouts are then compensated based on how accurately they matched candidates to the position.

NotchUp's proprietary technology monitors Talent Scout performance and accuracy, and uses that information as part of a formula for computing candidate ratings, and also factors this data into the algorithms for assigning work to the scouts.  Scouts are provided feedback they can use to improve their accuracy, and therefore their earnings, over time.

The company was started in 2008 by co-founders Jim Ambras and Rob Ellis and initially offered a Pay for Interview service.  It was recently listed by Business Insider as one of the “20 Hot Silicon Valley Startups You Need To Watch" in 2010.  The company has seed funding from Floodgate, Nueva Ventures and Steve Blank.

References

External links
 NotchUp, Inc.

Crowdsourcing
Internet properties established in 2008
Recruitment software
Social information processing